Australobius scabrior is a species of centipede in the Lithobiidae family. It was first described in 1920 by American biologist Ralph Vary Chamberlin.

Distribution
The species occurs in the eastern states of mainland Australia: Queensland, New South Wales and Victoria. The type locality is Kuranda, on the Atherton Tableland of north-eastern Queensland.

Behaviour
The centipedes are solitary terrestrial predators that inhabit plant litter and soil.

References

 

 
scabrior
Centipedes of Australia
Endemic fauna of Australia
Fauna of New South Wales
Fauna of Queensland
Fauna of Victoria (Australia)
Animals described in 1920
Taxa named by Ralph Vary Chamberlin